Simple trust may refer to:

 A Simple trust in United States trust law
 A Bare trust in Australia